Kerewe may refer to:

 Kerewe people
 Kerewe language